The hollow cathode effect allows electrical conduction at a lower voltage or with more current in a cold-cathode gas-discharge lamp when the cathode is a conductive tube open at one end than a similar lamp with a flat cathode.  The hollow cathode effect was recognized by Friedrich Paschen in 1916.

In a hollow cathode, the electron emitting surface is in the inside of the tube.  Several processes contribute to enhanced performance of a hollow cathode:

The pendulum effect, where an electron oscillates back and forth in the tube, creating secondary electrons along the way
The photoionization effect, where photons emitted in the tube cause further ionization
Stepwise ionization
Sputtering

The hollow cathode effect is utilized in the electrodes for neon signs, in hollow-cathode lamps, and more.

References

Atomic physics
Electrodes
Gas discharge lamps